Lisinski may refer to:

Vatroslav Lisinski (1819–1854), Croatian composer
Vatroslav Lisinski Concert Hall, concert hall and convention center in Zagreb
Vatroslav Lisinski School of Music, secondary-level music school in Zagreb
Lisinski (film), 1944 film about Vatroslav Lisinski directed by Oktavijan Miletić